Notation3, or N3 as it is more commonly known, is a shorthand non-XML serialization of Resource Description Framework models, designed with human-readability in mind: N3 is much more compact and readable than XML RDF notation. The format is being developed by Tim Berners-Lee and others from the Semantic Web community. A formalization of the logic underlying N3 was published by Berners-Lee and others in 2008. 

N3 has several features that go beyond a serialization for RDF models, such as support for RDF-based rules. Turtle is a simplified, RDF-only subset of N3.

Examples

The following is an RDF model in standard XML notation:

<rdf:RDF
    xmlns:rdf="http://www.w3.org/1999/02/22-rdf-syntax-ns#"
    xmlns:dc="http://purl.org/dc/elements/1.1/">
  <rdf:Description rdf:about="https://en.wikipedia.org/wiki/Tony_Benn">
    <dc:title>Tony Benn</dc:title>
    <dc:publisher>Wikipedia</dc:publisher>
  </rdf:Description>
</rdf:RDF>

may be written in Notation3 like this:

@prefix dc: <http://purl.org/dc/elements/1.1/>.

<https://en.wikipedia.org/wiki/Tony_Benn>
  dc:title "Tony Benn";
  dc:publisher "Wikipedia".

This N3 code above would also be in valid Turtle syntax.

Comparison of Notation3, Turtle, and N-Triples

See also
 N-Triples
 Turtle (syntax)

External links
Notation 3 W3C Submission
Notation 3 Outline on W3C Design Issues by Tim Berners-Lee
Notation 3 Primer: Getting into RDF & Semantic Web using N3
A Rough Guide to Notation3
RDF for "Little Languages"
An editing mode of N3 for Emacs
An editing mode of N3 for vim
An editing mode of N3 for textmate
An editing mode of N3 for gedit
EulerGUI, an IDE centered on N3 editor with translation from RDF, with validation, prefix management, uploading of resources, graph view, table view, etc.

References

Resource Description Framework
Computer file formats